Proto-Loloish is the reconstructed ancestor of the Loloish languages. Reconstructions include those of David Bradley (1979), James Matisoff (2003), and Ziwo Lama (2012).

In later publications, in place of Loloish, David Bradley instead uses the term Ngwi based on a conservative autonym in the Sanie language.

Bradley (1979)

Matisoff (2003)

Li (2011)
Li Yongsui (2011) reconstructs Proto-Lolo-Burmese (Proto-Mian-Yi 缅彝) based on 30 languages.

Lama (2012)
Lama (2012) reconstructs 37 consonants for Proto-Loloish (which he calls Proto-Nisoic), 7 of which (marked in green) can occur as syllable finals. The glides /w/ and /j/ occur medially.

Vowels (8): 
Tones (5): 1, 2, 3 (unchecked tones), H, L (checked tones)

References and notes

Bradley, David. 1979. Proto-Loloish. London: Curzon Press. .
Lama, Ziwo Qiu-Fuyuan. 2012. Subgrouping Of Nisoic (Yi) Languages: A Study From The Perspectives Of Shared Innovation And Phylogenetic Estimation. Ph.D. dissertation, University of Texas at Arlington.
Li Yongsui [李永燧]. 2011. Burmo-Yi Phonology [缅彝语音韵学]. Beijing: China Social Sciences Academy Press.
Matisoff, James. 2003. Handbook of Proto-Tibeto-Burman: System and Philosophy of Sino-Tibetan Reconstruction. University of California publications in linguistics, v. 135. Berkeley: University of California Press. .

See also
Proto-Tibeto-Burman language
Lolo-Burmese languages
Loloish languages

Loloish